In number theory, the Shimura correspondence is a correspondence between modular forms F of half integral weight k+1/2, and modular forms f of even weight 2k, discovered by . It has the property that the eigenvalue of a Hecke operator Tn2 on F is equal to the eigenvalue of Tn on f.

Let  be a holomorphic cusp form with weight  and character  . For any prime number p, let

where  's are the eigenvalues of the Hecke operators  determined by p.

Using the functional equation of L-function, Shimura showed that

is a holomorphic modular function with weight 2k and character  .

See also 

 Theta correspondence

References

Modular forms